Carlos Calvo (February 26, 1824, Buenos Aires – May 2, 1906, Paris) was an Argentine publicist and historian, who devoted himself to the study of the law.

In 1860 he was sent by the Paraguayan government on a special mission to London and Paris. Remaining in France, he published in 1863 his Derecho internacional teórico y práctico de Europa y America, in two volumes, and at the same time brought out a French version. The book contained the essence of what has come to be known as the Calvo Doctrine in international law is named after him. The doctrine holds that jurisdiction in international investment disputes lies with the country in which the investment is located. The book immediately took rank as one of the highest modern authorities on the subject, and by 1887 the first French edition had become enlarged to six volumes.

In 1869, Calvo published an article arguing that states undergoing civil war were not responsible for harm caused to aliens as a result of riot or civil war. According to Kathryn Greenman, Calvo's article influenced later international legal debates about state responsibility for rebel actions.

Between 1862 and 1869 he published in Spanish and French his great collection in fifteen volumes of the treaties and other diplomatic acts of the South American republics, and between 1864 and 1875 his Annales historiques de la révolution de l'Amérique latine, in five volumes. In 1884 he was one of the founders at the Ghent congress of the Institut de Droit International. In the following year he was Argentine minister at Berlin, and published his Dictionnaire du droit international publique et privat in that city.

References

Sources

 "Carlos Calvo".  American Journal of International Law 1(1):137-38 (1907)

External links 
 

19th-century Argentine historians
Argentine male writers
1824 births
1906 deaths
Writers from Buenos Aires
Argentine legal professionals
International law scholars
Ambassadors of Argentina to the Holy See
Members of the Institut de Droit International
Burials at La Recoleta Cemetery
Argentine people of Galician descent
Male non-fiction writers